Georgios Paraschos (born 23 August 1952) is a Greek professional football manager and former player.

Playing career

As a football player, he began his career from the youth academy of PAOK in 1967. He became a professional player in 1971 and played with the Kastoria team until 1985, making appearances for the club in the Alpha Ethniki. He had four caps for the Greece national football team.

Managerial career
As a coach, he started in 1985, but as an amateur, in 1989 he coached Kastoria (2nd Division) until 1992. After that he coached teams such as: Trikala, Anagenissi Karditsa, Kavala, Iraklis, APOEL, Aris, PAS Giannina, Paniliakos, Niki Volos, Akratitos, PAOK, Skoda Xanthi and Chalkidona (which later merged into Atromitos). On 31 January 2011 he replaced Marinos Ouzounidis as manager of Iraklis.

Managerial statistics

includes a game against PAOK (2-0 win) in which Paraschos wasn't present because he was tested positive to COVID-19.

Honours
Greek Football Cup: 1980 with Kastoria

References

1952 births
Living people
Footballers from Thessaloniki
Greece international footballers
Greek footballers
Greek football managers
Greek Macedonians
Aris Thessaloniki F.C. managers
Kastoria F.C. players
PAOK FC players
APOEL FC managers
Iraklis Thessaloniki F.C. managers
OFI Crete F.C. managers
PAS Giannina F.C. managers
PAOK FC managers
Xanthi F.C. managers
Expatriate football managers in Cyprus
Super League Greece managers
Kavala F.C. managers
Trikala F.C. managers
Association football midfielders
Atromitos F.C. managers
Greek expatriate football managers